An Episcopal Palace is the official residence of a bishop. It may refer to:

 Wells episcopal palace, Somerset, England
 Episcopal Palace, Strasbourg, Alsace, France
 Episcopal Palace, Fiesole, Tuscany, Italy
 Episcopal Palace, Siena, Italy
 Episcopal Palace, Vienna, Italy
 Krakow Episcopal Palace (Warsaw)
 Episcopal Palace, Angra do Heroísmo, Azores, Portugal
 Episcopal Palace, Braga, Norte Region, Portugal
 Episcopal Palace, Porto, Norte Region, Portugal
 Episcopal palace, Oradea, Crișana, Romania
 Episcopal Summer Palace, Bratislava, Slovakia
 Episcopal Palace, Astorga, Castilla y León, Spain
 Episcopal Palace of Cordoba, Andalucía, Spain

See also 
 Bishop's Palace (disambiguation)
 Archbishop's Palace (disambiguation), including Archepiscopal Palace
 List of palaces